Tobias "Toby" Mortimer Moll (20 July 1890 – 15 July 1916) was a South African rugby union player from Cape Town. He played for Randfontein RFC, Transvaal, and Western Province.

In the First World War, he first served with the South African forces in the South West Africa Campaign, then travelled to England where he joined the 9th Battalion Royal Leicestershire Regiment as a Second Lieutenant. He was hit by shrapnel during the Battle of Bazentin Ridge and died from his wounds the following day. He is buried at Méricourt-l'Abbé Cemetery.

Early life
Toby Moll was born on 20 July 1890 at Cape Town, Cape Province (today South Africa). He was the son of Tobias and Henrietta Moll of Potsdam, Cape Province. He was educated at South African College.

Rugby career
Moll played club rugby for the Hamilton's Club, Cape Town, and was also the team captain. He played for the provincial side of Transvaal from 1908 to 1910. Later he played for Western Province from 1910 to 1914.

International appearance

Military service
At the start of the First World War, Moll first served in the South West Africa Campaign with the South African forces fighting for the British Empire against the Germans. At the conclusion of that campaign, he travelled to England and joined the 9th (Service) Battalion of the Royal Leicestershire Regiment. The 9th Battalion, as part of the 110th Infantry Brigade, was involved in the Battle of Bazentin Ridge on 14–15 July 1916, with the objective of taking Bazentin le Petit village and wood, part of the Battle of the Somme. Moll was wounded on 14 July and evacuated but died the following day. An eyewitness account of Moll's death was written by a teammate of his from Hampton's, Harold Lewis Silberbauer of Kenilworth, Cape Town, who was also serving as an officer in the Leicestershire Regiment:

He is buried at Méricourt-l'Abbé Cemetery Extension (Grave II. D. 5).

See also
 List of international rugby union players killed in action during the First World War
 List of South Africa national rugby union players – Springbok no. 125

References

Bibliography

External links
 

White South African people
Rugby union forwards
South African rugby union players
South Africa international rugby union players
British military personnel killed in the Battle of the Somme
1916 deaths
1890 births
British Army personnel of World War I
Royal Leicestershire Regiment officers
Rugby union players from Cape Town
Hamilton RFC, Sea Point players
South African military personnel